Swinithwaite is a hamlet in the Yorkshire Dales, North Yorkshire, England. It lies on the A684 road,  miles east of Aysgarth.

The hamlet originally belonged to the Knights Templar but was later absorbed into the manor of West Witton which lies to the east. There is a belvedere in the grounds and a folly (known as Temple Folly after a nearby Knights Templar chapel). Both the belvedere and the folly were designed by John Foss of Richmond and have been converted into holiday accommodation. The hamlet does not have any amenities other than a farm shop.

The cellar in the farmhouse on the estate was once used for a scene in All Creatures Great and Small.

In one of Bernard Cornwell's Saxon stories, The Last Kingdom, the village Synningthwait is referenced. In that book, it claims the name means "place cleared by fire," after parts of it were torched to make room for more homes for the Danes.

References

Villages in North Yorkshire
Wensleydale